Sinezona subantarctica is a species of minute sea snail, a marine gastropod mollusc or micromollusk in the family Scissurellidae, the little slit shells.

Distribution
This species is endemic to Australia's Macquarie Islands, south of New Zealand.

References

 Powell A. W. B., New Zealand Mollusca, William Collins Publishers Ltd, Auckland, New Zealand 1979 
 Zelaya D.G. & Geiger D.L. (2007). Species of Scissurellidae and Anatomidae from Sub-Antarctic and Antarctic waters (Gastropopda: Vetigastropoda). Malacologia 49(2):393-443
 Geiger D.L. & Marshall B.A. (2012) New species of Scissurellidae, Anatomidae, and Larocheidae (Mollusca: Gastropoda: Vetigastropoda) from New Zealand and beyond. Zootaxa 3344: 1–33

Scissurellidae
Gastropods of Australia
Gastropods described in 1916